Oginskis may have the following meanings:

The plural form of the Polish surname Oginski, e.g., in the meaning Ogiński family.
A Lithuanian form of the surname "Oginski"
A Latvian surname:
Aleksejs Kuplovs-Oginskis, Latvian  football midfielder
Viktors Oginskis, Latvian rock musician